Javin Durrell White (born February 21, 1997) is an American football linebacker for the Chicago Bears of the National Football League (NFL). He played college football at UNLV.

Early life and high school
White was born in San Diego, California and grew up in Oakland, California. He attended Vanden High School in Fairfield, California for two years before transferring to Oakland's McClymonds High School and played wide receiver on the football team. As a senior, White caught 17 passes for 407 yards and eight touchdowns. He was rated a three-star recruit and committed to play college football at UNLV over offers from New Mexico and New Mexico State.

College career
White was a member of the UNLV Rebels for five seasons, redshirting as a true freshman as changed positions to defensive back. He played primarily on special teams as a redshirt freshman and began to see significant playing time as a safety/linebacker hybrid the following season, starting the final five games and making 42 tackles and intercepting two passes. As a redshirt junior, he started all 12 of UNLV's games and 74 tackles, 6.5 tackles for loss and two sacks while leading the team with four interceptions along with four passes broken up and four forced fumbles. He was named honorable mention All-Mountain West Conference as a redshirt senior after finished the season with 79 tackles, 8.5 tackles for loss and three interceptions. White finished his collegiate career with 201 tackles, 18 tackles for loss and 3.5 sacks with nine interception, 15 passes defended, seven forced fumbles and one fumble recovery in 43 games played, 29 of which he started.

Professional career

Las Vegas Raiders
White was signed by the Las Vegas Raiders as an undrafted free agent on April 25, 2020. He was waived during final roster cuts on September 5, 2020, and signed to the team's practice squad the next day. The Raiders elevated White to the active roster on September 21, 2020, and made his debut that night on Monday Night Football against the New Orleans Saints. He reverted to the practice squad after the game. He was elevated to the active roster again for the weeks 11, 15, and 16 games against the Kansas City Chiefs, Los Angeles Chargers, and Miami Dolphins, and reverted to the practice squad again following each game. He signed a reserve/future contract on January 5, 2021.

On September 2, 2021, White was placed on injured reserve. He was activated on November 1, then released the next day. He was re-signed to the practice squad on November 4.

New York Jets
On December 29, 2021, White was signed by the New York Jets off the Raiders practice squad. He was waived on July 29, 2022.

Chicago Bears
On August 7, 2022, White signed with the Chicago Bears. He was waived/injured on August 16, 2022 and placed on injured reserve.

References

External links
 UNLV Rebels bio
 Las Vegas Raiders bio

Living people
1997 births
American football linebackers
Chicago Bears players
Las Vegas Raiders players
New York Jets players
Players of American football from Oakland, California
UNLV Rebels football players